Frederik Splet (died 1704) was a Dano-Norwegian government official.  He served as the County Governor of Nordland county from 1703 until his death in 1704.

References

1704 deaths
County governors of Norway
County governors of Nordland